Plasmodium tanzaniae is a parasite of the genus Plasmodium.

Like all Plasmodium species P. tanzaniae has both vertebrate and insect hosts. The vertebrate hosts for this parasite are reptiles.

Description 

The parasite was first described by Telford in 1988.

Geographical occurrence 

This species was described in Tanzania.

Clinical features and host pathology 

The only known hosts are chameleons (Chamaeleo species)

References 

tanzaniae